Ariel Behar and Gonzalo Escobar were the defending champions but chose to play in Rio de Janeiro instead.

Marcelo Arévalo and Jean-Julien Rojer won the title, defeating Aleksandr Nedovyesov and Aisam-ul-Haq Qureshi in the final, 6–2, 6–7(5–7), [10–4].

Seeds

Draw

Draw

References

External links
 Main draw

Delray Beach Open - Doubles
2022 Doubles
Delray Beach Open – Doubles
Delray Beach Open – Doubles